Drnek is a municipality and village in Kladno District in the Central Bohemian Region of the Czech Republic. It has about 200 inhabitants.

History
The settlement of Drnek was founded by Count Adolf Bernard of Martinic in 1726, near a hunting lodge from 1711.

References

Villages in Kladno District